Since its inception, the Photographic Society of Japan has annually presented a large number of awards.

Awards

1952–1956

1957–1984

1985–1993

1994–2003

2004–2008

2009–2017

2018-2020

Notes

External links 
Photographic Society of Japan Awards
Awards established in 1951
Japanese awards
Photography awards